The Jincheng Seaside Park is a park in Jincheng Township, Kinmen County, Taiwan. The park faces the Jiangong Island and Kinmen Harbor.

Features
Cactus is extensively used in the landscaping of the park, equipped with information boards.

See also
 List of tourist attractions in Taiwan

References

Jincheng Township
Parks in Kinmen County